Tuuli Vahtra (born March 4, 1989 in Kõo Parish) is an Estonian chess player. She received the FIDE title of Woman FIDE Master (WFM) in 2009.

Biography
In 2007 Tuuli Vahtra graduated from gymnasium in Viljandi and in 2010 graduated from Tallinn University of Technology Faculty of Economics with bachelor's degree.
From 1999 to 2007 she participated in the European Junior Chess Championships and the World Junior Chess Championships in different age groups. In 2007 Tuuli Vahtra won the Estonian Junior Chess Championships.
In Estonian Women's Chess Championship Tuuli Vahtra has won gold (2010) and 2 silver medals (2011, 2012).

Tuuli Vahtra played for Estonia in Chess Olympiads:
 In 2008, at reserve board in the 38th Chess Olympiad in Dresden (+5 −1 =3);
 In 2010, at fourth board in the 39th Chess Olympiad in Khanty-Mansiysk (+4 −3 =3);
 In 2012, at fourth board in the 40th Chess Olympiad in Istanbul (+5 −1 =3).

In 2003, 2005 and 2007 Tuuli Vahtra was named the best young chess player in Estonia. In 2008, she was named the best chess player of Estonia.

References

External links
 
 
 

1989 births
Living people
People from Põhja-Sakala Parish
Estonian female chess players
Chess Woman FIDE Masters
Tallinn University of Technology alumni